Söhnke Matthias Bartram is a professor in the Department of Finance at Warwick Business School (WBS). He is also a research fellow in the Financial Economics programme and the International Macroeconomics and Finance programme of the Centre for Economic Policy Research (CEPR), a charter member of Risk Who's Who, and a member of an international think tank for policy advice to the German government. Prior to joining the University of Warwick, he held faculty positions at Lancaster University and Maastricht University and worked for several years in quantitative investment management at State Street Global Advisors as Head of the London Advanced Research Center.

Work 
Bartram's immediate research activities center around issues in international finance, corporate finance and financial markets, especially financial risk management. His current research investigates, for example, the efficiency of U.S. and international equity markets using non-discretionary quantitative analysis of firm fundamentals, anomalies in international day and night returns, the relation between idiosyncratic risk and market risk, the interactions between defined-benefit pensions and corporate financial policy, and the effect of the use of financial derivatives on the risk and exposure of non-financial firms around the world. He is ranked number 251 in the world based on downloads on SSRN.

Career 
He completed his Bachelor of Science and Master of Science degrees in business administration and economics at the Saarland University/University of Michigan, and obtained a PhD degree with distinction from WHU – Otto Beisheim School of Management.

Bartram has been a visiting scholar at the Fisher College of Business/Ohio State University, the Kenan-Flagler Business School/University of North Carolina, the University of Texas at Austin, the Kiel Institute for the World Economy, the Financial Markets Group at the London School of Economics, the UCLA Anderson School of Management, and a visiting professor of finance at London Business School, the Stern School of Business at New York University, the Center for Financial Studies at Goethe University Frankfurt, the Bank of Finland, the European University Institute, and the Einaudi Institute for Economics and Finance. He has received scholarships by the German Academic Exchange Service, the Fulbright Commission, the German National Merit Foundation and the Federal Ministry of Economics and Technology (Germany). Bartram worked for several years in quantitative investment research for State Street Global Advisors as head of the London Advanced Research Center and is a consultant to various financial institutions and investment companies.

Bartram has been awarded a higher doctorate, the degree of Doctor of Science (DSc), by the University of Warwick.

Honors and awards 
 Humboldt Prize
 Christensen Fellow, St Catherine's College, Oxford 
 Citations of Excellence Award by Emerald
 Higher Doctorate, Doctor of Science (DSc) by University of Warwick
 2nd Biannual Pearson/Prentice Hall Best Paper Award by Financial Management
 3rd Biannual Best Paper Award by Journal of Empirical Finance
 Josseph de la Vega Prize by Federation of European Securities Exchanges
  Asia Asset Management – The Centre for Asset Management Research & Investments (CAMRI) – CFA Institute Prize in Asset Management

Bibliography

References

External links 
 Söhnke Bartram's Profile at Warwick Business School
 Söhnke Bartram's Research Papers

German economists
Living people
Academics of the University of Warwick
Academics of Lancaster University
Academic staff of Maastricht University
Saarland University alumni
Ross School of Business alumni
Year of birth missing (living people)